Dolenz, Jones, Boyce & Hart was a supergroup, consisting of songwriting/performing duo Boyce and Hart and two members of the Monkees, Micky Dolenz and Davy Jones. Boyce and Hart had written many of the Monkees' biggest hits, such as "Last Train to Clarksville" and "(Theme From) The Monkees". The group existed only for a short time in 1976, recording one eponymous album.

Background
The group was called Dolenz, Jones, Boyce & Hart because they were legally prohibited from using the name "The Monkees". Former Monkees members Michael Nesmith and Peter Tork—both of whom had left the Monkees before their final album, Changes (1970)—were also invited to join the supergroup, but both declined.

Dolenz and Jones had been the only two members of the Monkees to contribute to Changes. As such, and because of Boyce and Hart's close songwriting ties to the Monkees, several publications, such as Allmusic, consider Dolenz, Jones, Boyce & Hart to be a de facto Monkees reunion album, without the rights to the Monkees name. Most of the musicians that appear on the album were featured on Monkees albums in the past. A majority of the vocals are performed by Dolenz and Jones, with Boyce and Hart contributing backing vocals and the occasional lead vocal, such as Hart on "I Love You (And I'm Glad That I Said It)". Although the album failed to make much of an impact when originally released, renewal of interest in the Monkees led to its reissue on compact disc in 2005.

During their concert tour promoting the album, Tork joined Dolenz, Jones, Boyce & Hart onstage for a guest appearance at Disneyland on July 4, 1976. Later that year, Tork reunited with Jones and Dolenz in the studio for the recording of the single "Christmas Is My Time of the Year" b/w "White Christmas", which saw a limited release for fan club members that holiday season. A promotional live album, Concert in Japan, was released in 1981.

Dolenz, Jones, Boyce & Hart

Track listing

Personnel

 Micky Dolenz – vocals, guitar, percussion, drums, keyboards
 Davy Jones – vocals
 Tommy Boyce – vocals, guitar
 Bobby Hart – vocals, keyboards

Additional musicians
 Henry Diltz – banjo
 Skip Edwards – keyboards
 Joey Carbone – keyboards
 Neil Norman – guitar, Moog synthesizer
 Chip Douglas – guitar
 Cyrus Faryar – guitar
 Jerry Yester – guitar
 Louie Shelton – guitar
 Jeffrey Staton – guitar
 Michael Staton – guitar
 Keith Allison – bass
 Jerry Summers – drums
 Jim Helmer – drums
 Emil Richards – percussion
 Daniel Catherine – effects

Technical
 Tommy Boyce – producer
 Bobby Hart – producer
 Jimmie Haskell – string arrangements
 David Hassinger – engineer
 Sergio Reye – engineer
 Ron Hicklin – vocal director
 Larry Michael White – photography

Concert in Japan

Track listing

Personnel
 Micky Dolenz – vocals, guitar
 Davy Jones – vocals
 Tommy Boyce – vocals, guitar
 Bobby Hart – vocals

Additional musicians
 Keith Allison – guitar, vocals (lead on "Action")
 Steve Johnson – keyboards
 Rick Tierny – bass
 Jerry Summers – drums

Technical
 Micky Dolenz – producer
 Davy Jones – producer 
 Tommy Boyce – producer
 Bobby Hart – producer
 John Palladino – executive producer

References

1976 albums
Pop rock albums by American artists
The Monkees albums
Capitol Records albums